Jan-Henning Campher (born ) is a South African professional rugby union player who currently plays for the  in RFU Championship. His regular position is hooker.

Youth rugby

In 2014, Campher represented South Africa Schools in the 2014 Under-18 International Series, playing in matches against France, Wales and England.

He played in all five of South Africa Under-20s matches at the 2016 World Rugby Under 20 Championship in England. He played off the bench in their opening match in Pool C of the tournament as South Africa came from behind to beat Japan 59–19, and their next pool match as South Africa were beaten 13–19 by Argentina. He started in their final pool match as South Africa bounced back to secure a 40-31 bonus-point victory over France to secure a semi-final place as the best runner-up in the competition. He was also used as a replacement in the semifinal, as South Africa faced three-time champions England, with the hosts proving too strong for South Africa, knocking them out of the competition with a 39–17 victory – and started against Argentina in the third-place play-off final. Campher scored a try as Argentina beat South Africa convincingly, winning 49–19 and in the process condemning South Africa to fourth place in the competition.

Blue Bulls

He started their next five matches before reverting to the  squad for the 2017 Under-21 Provincial Championship.

Personal life

Campher is the son of former  prop Lourens Campher.

References

South African rugby union players
Living people
1996 births
Rugby union players from Pretoria
Rugby union hookers
Blue Bulls players
South Africa Under-20 international rugby union players
Ealing Trailfinders Rugby Club players
South African expatriate sportspeople in England
Lions (United Rugby Championship) players
Golden Lions players